Hopewell High School is a public learning institution located in Hanover, Jamaica.

History

The Hopewell High School opened its doors on September 4, 2006, with a student population of approximately 400 students; 207 students being females and 193 males. There were 19 academic staff members, 1 school nurse, 8 administrative workers, 7 janitorial workers, 2 assistant cooks, a chef, and three grounds men. The pioneer students came mainly from the surrounding areas such as Hanover and St. James. These students were placed in seven groups of grade 7 and seven groups of grade 9 (namely Hopewell).

Clubs

Performing Arts
Inter-School Christian Fellowship
Spanish
Debating
Bible Quiz
Football
Environmental
Chess
Junior Jacees (JCI)
Sign Language
Band
Choir
Tourism Action
Culture
4-H

External links
 Hopewell High School at LuceaTown.info

Schools in Jamaica
Buildings and structures in Hanover Parish